Ali-Asghar Ahmadi is an Iranian reformist politician who last hold office as the political deputy to the Minister of Interior.

He was formerly a lawmaker and served as the governor of Golestan Province, as well as the secretary-general of Iranian Red Crescent Society.

References

Iranian Vice Ministers
Iranian governors
Members of the 5th Islamic Consultative Assembly
Islamic Iran Solidarity Party politicians
1956 births
Living people
People from Shahrud, Iran
Secretaries-General of political parties in Iran
Islamic Revolutionary Guard Corps officers
Governors of Golestan Province